Mikael Nils Aggefors (born 20 January 1985) is a Swedish handball player for Aalborg Håndbold and the Swedish national team.

Achievements
EHF Champions League
 Runner-up: 2021
Danish Handball League
 Winner: 2017, 2019, 2020, 2021
 Runner-up: 2022
Danish Cup
 Winner: 2018, 2021
 Runner-up: 2020
Danish Super Cup
 Winner: 2019, 2020, 2021, 2022
IHF Super Globe
 Bronze medal: 2021
Handbollsligan
 Winner: 2014

 Individual awards
 MVP (Danish: Pokalfighter) in the Danish Cup 2018

References

External links
 
 

Handball players from Stockholm
Swedish male handball players
Aalborg Håndbold players
Expatriate handball players
Swedish expatriate sportspeople in Denmark
1985 births
Living people
Handball players at the 2020 Summer Olympics
Olympic handball players of Sweden